LRJ can refer to:

 Laksar Junction railway station, a railway station in Uttarakhand, India.
 Le Mars Municipal Airport, an airport in Iowa, United States.
 Lincombian-Ranisian-Jerzmanowician, a culture of the late Neanderthals or modern humans
 LeBron Raymone James, American NBA player, better known as King James.